The British Rail Class 100 diesel multiple units were built by Gloucester Railway Carriage and Wagon Company Limited from 1956 to 1958, designed and built in collaboration with the Transport Sales Dept. of T.I. (Group Services) Ltd.

Introduction
The class were designed to be lightweight to allow for good acceleration.  None were selected for refurbishment and withdrawals started in 1969. The last passenger car was withdrawn from service in 1988.

Under initial classification 1973, the DTCLs became class 143 but were later reclassified as class 100.

DTCL 56111 was used as a training aid by the Ministry of Defence until 1985.  

Two sets entered Departmental service: DMBS 51122 and DTCL 56300 became ADB975664 and ADB975637  for use as the "Stourton Saloon" – the Eastern Region General Manager's saloon – for which the class gained a small amount of "fame";  this pair were scrapped, in 1990, at Mayer-Newman's yard at Snailwell, in Cambridgeshire.  The other pair were ADB975349 and ADB975539 (formerly DMBS 51116 and DTCL 56101) and were used as the Eastern Region inspection saloon, until being scrapped in 1993.  

DTCL 56106 was also taken into Departmental service, becoming ADB977191, part of the Crewe Works test train. This vehicle survived the longest time on the national network, having been stored for some years in Basford Hall yard, out of use. The final public appearance of ADB977191 was at the Crewe Works Open Day, on 21 May 2000, following which it was scrapped.

Preservation

Following their withdrawal from service in East Anglia, in 1973, DMBSs 50341 and 51118, together with DTCLs 56097 and 56099, were acquired by the North Yorkshire Moors Railway, where they were painted in green and cream and given the numbers D10, D11, D20 and D21. They finally became redundant in the mid-1980s and were disposed of.

The class has not fared well in preservation. Six cars entered preservation, now only half of which still exist. 50341 and 56099 were preserved by the West Somerset Railway, but were scrapped & dismantled in 1991. The National Railway Museum had intended to preserve 53355 (ex 50355), but a lack of space prevented this car, and the Class 105 coupled to it from being moved to York and they were vandalised beyond repair at Crewe. DTCL 56317 was scrapped in October 2016.

References

External links
E56301's Web Page
History of the Class 100s

100
Gloucester multiple units
British Rail Departmental Units
Train-related introductions in 1957